The following television stations broadcast on digital channel 12 in the United States:

 K12AK-D in Crested Butte, Colorado, on virtual channel 7, which rebroadcasts K11AT-D
 K12AL-D in Waunita Hot Springs, Colorado, on virtual channel 7, which rebroadcasts K25PT-D
 K12AV-D in Pateros/Mansfield, Washington
 K12BA-D in Winthrop-Twisp, Washington
 K12BE-D in Orondo, etc., Washington
 K12CV-D in Riverside, Washington
 K12CW-D in Malott/Wakefield, Washington
 K12CX-D in Tonasket, Washington
 K12DE-D in Lund & Preston, Nevada
 K12FB-D in Saco, Montana
 K12GP-D in Dodson, Montana
 K12JJ-D in Benbow, etc., California
 K12LA-D in Kenai, etc., Alaska
 K12LF-D in Coolin, Idaho
 K12LI-D in Thayne, etc., Wyoming
 K12LO-D in Ferndale, Montana
 K12LS-D in Challis, Idaho
 K12LU-D in West Glacier, etc., Montana
 K12LV-D in Dryden, Washington
 K12LX-D in Powderhorn, Colorado, on virtual channel 9
 K12MD-D in Sleetmute, Alaska
 K12MI-D in Laketown, etc., Utah, on virtual channel 5, which rebroadcasts KSL-TV
 K12MM-D in Girdwood Valley, Alaska
 K12MS-D in Elko, Nevada
 K12MW-D in Manhattan, Nevada
 K12NH-D in Hobbs, New Mexico
 K12OC-D in Red River, New Mexico
 K12OF-D in Bullhead City, Arizona
 K12OG-D in Taos, New Mexico
 K12PT-D in Ryndon, Nevada
 K12QH-D in Dolores, Colorado
 K12QM-D in Thomasville, Colorado
 K12QO-D in Aspen, Colorado
 K12QQ-D in Cedar City, Utah, on virtual channel 14, which rebroadcasts KJZZ-TV
 K12QS-D in Mink Creek, Idaho, on virtual channel 14, which rebroadcasts KJZZ-TV
 K12QT-D in Trout Creek, etc., Montana
 K12QW-D in Silver City, New Mexico
 K12QY-D in Leamington, Utah
 K12RA-D in Colstrip, Montana
 K12RD-D in Coulee City, Washington
 K12RE-D in Denton, Montana
 K12RF-D in Healy, etc., Alaska
 K12XA-D in Abilene, Texas
 K12XC-D in Salina & Redmond, Utah
 K12XD-D in Aurora, etc., Utah
 K12XE-D in Woodland, Utah
 K12XG-D in Roosevelt, Utah, on virtual channel 11, which rebroadcasts KBYU-TV
 K12XH-D in Price, Utah, on virtual channel 11, which rebroadcasts KBYU-TV
 K12XI-D in Helper, Utah
 K12XJ-D in Modesto, California, on virtual channel 49
 K12XK-D in Denver, Colorado, on virtual channel 27
 K12XO-D in Midland/Odessa, Texas
 K12XP-D in Phoenix, Arizona
 K12XQ-D in Monroe, Louisiana
 K44FU-D in Long Valley Junction, Utah
 KAMU-TV in College Station/Bryan, Texas
 KBMT in Beaumont, Texas
 KCCW-TV in Walker, Minnesota, on virtual channel 12
 KCWY-DT in Casper, Wyoming
 KDOC-TV in Anaheim, California, on virtual channel 56
 KDRV in Medford, Oregon
 KEYC-TV in Mankato, Minnesota
 KGEB in Tulsa, Oklahoma
 KGO-TV in San Francisco, California, on virtual channel 7
 KGTF in Hagåtña, Guam
 KIIN in Iowa City, Iowa
 KJJM-LD in Dallas & Mesquite, Texas, on virtual channel 34
 KJKZ-LP in Fresno, California
 KJOU-LD in Bakersfield, California
 KKCO in Grand Junction, Colorado
 KMAU in Wailuku, Hawaii
 KNRR in Pembina, North Dakota
 KOBF in Farmington, New Mexico
 KPTV in Portland, Oregon, to move to channel 21, on virtual channel 12
 KRJR-LD in Sacramento, California
 KRNE-TV in Merriman, Nebraska
 KRNV-DT in Reno, Nevada
 KSAT-TV in San Antonio, Texas
 KSCW-DT in Wichita, Kansas
 KSNK in McCook, Nebraska
 KSQA in Topeka, Kansas
 KSVC-LD in Marysvale, Utah
 KTHV in Little Rock, Arkansas
 KTTM in Huron, South Dakota
 KTVH-DT in Helena, Montana
 KUID-TV in Moscow, Idaho
 KUON-TV in Lincoln, Nebraska
 KUSE-LD in Seattle, Washington, on virtual channel 46
 KUTF in Logan, Utah, on virtual channel 12
 KVGA-LD in Las Vegas, Nevada
 KVIH-TV in Clovis, New Mexico
 KXII in Sherman, Texas
 KXMB-TV in Bismarck, North Dakota
 KYAV-LD in Palm Springs, California
 KYUR in Anchorage, Alaska
 W12AQ-D in Black Mountain, North Carolina, on virtual channel 13, which rebroadcasts WLOS
 W12AR-D in Waynesville, etc., North Carolina
 W12CI-D in Hot Springs, North Carolina, on virtual channel 13, which rebroadcasts WLOS
 W12DI-D in Key West, Florida, on virtual channel 8, which rebroadcasts WGEN-TV
 WBAL-TV in Baltimore, Maryland, on virtual channel 11
 WBBM-TV in Chicago, Illinois, on virtual channel 2
 WBOY-TV in Clarksburg, West Virginia
 WBPA-LD in Pittsburgh, Pennsylvania, on virtual channel 12
 WBQP-CD in Pensacola, Florida
 WCIQ in Mount Cheaha, Alabama
 WCQA-LD in Springfield, Illinois
 WDNV-LD in Atlanta, Georgia, on virtual channel 12
 WEHT in Evansville, Indiana
 WFXL in Albany, Georgia
 WGBS-LD in Carrollton, Virginia
 WHDC-LD in Charleston, South Carolina
 WICU-TV in Erie, Pennsylvania
 WINM in Angola, Indiana
 WJRT-TV in Flint, Michigan
 WJTV in Jackson, Mississippi
 WKRC-TV in Cincinnati, Ohio, on virtual channel 12
 WMBQ-CD in New York, New York, uses WNET's spectrum, on virtual channel 46
 WMFD-TV in Mansfield, Ohio
 WNAC-TV in Providence, Rhode Island
 WNCT-TV in Greenville, North Carolina
 WNDT-CD in Manhattan, New York, uses WNET's spectrum, on virtual channel 14
 WNET in Newark, New Jersey, on virtual channel 13
 WNYT in Albany, New York
 WOLE-DT in Aguadilla, Puerto Rico, on virtual channel 12
 WPRQ-LD in Clarksdale, Mississippi
 WPTV-TV in West Palm Beach, Florida
 WRDW-TV in Augusta, Georgia
 WSOC-CR in Shelby, North Carolina, on virtual channel 9, which rebroadcasts WSOC-TV and WAXN-TV
 WSOC-TV (DRT) in Statesville, North Carolina, on virtual channel 9
 WTVT in Tampa, Florida, on virtual channel 13
 WVPT in Staunton, Virginia, to move to channel 15
 WVPY in New Market, Virginia, uses WVPT's spectrum, to move to channel 15
 WYMT-TV in Hazard, Kentucky
 WYOU in Scranton, Pennsylvania

The following stations, which are no longer licensed, formerly broadcast on digital channel 12:
 K12AA-D in Troy, Montana
 K12BF-D in Ardenvoir, Washington
 K12OV-D in Shelter Cove, California
 K12QZ-D in San Luis Obispo, California
 KWVG-LD in Malaga, etc., Washington

References

12 digital